André Ribeiro may refer to:
André Ribeiro (racing driver) (1966–2021), Brazilian racing driver
André Ribeiro (footballer, born 1988), Brazilian football defender
André Ribeiro (footballer, born 1997), Portuguese football forward

See also
Andrew Ribeiro (born 1990), American soccer defender